Greater Kokstad Local Municipality is an administrative area in the Harry Gwala District of KwaZulu-Natal in South Africa. Kokstad is derived from Dutch, and it means "town of Kok". It was named after Adam Kok III.

Kokstad serves as the service centre and commercial hub for most of East Griqualand and nearby parts of the Eastern Cape it borders with.

Main places
The 2011 census for the Greater Kokstad Local Municipality states a population of 65,981 with these most populated main places:

Politics 

The municipal council consists of nineteen members elected by mixed-member proportional representation. Ten councillors are elected by first-past-the-post voting in ten wards, while the remaining nine are chosen from party lists so that the total number of party representatives is proportional to the number of votes received. In the election of 1 November 2021 the African National Congress (ANC) won a majority of twelve seats on the council.
The following table shows the results of the election.

References

External links
 https://web.archive.org/web/20071012040205/http://www.kokstad.org.za/

Local municipalities of the Harry Gwala District Municipality
Kokstad